Rumsey is a hamlet in southern Alberta, Canada within Starland County.

Demographics 
The population of Rumsey according to the 2013 municipal census conducted by Starland County is 64.

See also 
List of communities in Alberta
List of former urban municipalities in Alberta
List of hamlets in Alberta

References 

Hamlets in Alberta
Former villages in Alberta
Starland County
Populated places disestablished in 1995